The University of Batna 2 (Mostefa Ben Boulaïd) (Arabic: جامعة باتنة 2 مصطفى بن بولعيد) is a non-profit Algerian public University located in Fesdis, Wilaya of Batna in Algeria. It was founded in 1977 as University of Batna and then restructured in July 2015 by presidential decree, which led to a split into two distinct universities, namely University of Batna 1 and University of Batna 2. On 4 February 2017, the university was named after the Algerian national Hero Mostefa Ben Boulaïd. Also called the father of the Algerian revolution whose centenary celebration was held in the city of Batna. Now UB2 University Mostefa Ben Boulaïd is one of the largest Universities in Algeria and Africa with its (33.458) enrolled students and (1,833) staff members. Under the authority of the vice-chancellor Dr. Tayeb Bouzid, the university comprises a general management office, four vice-rectorates, five faculties, three institutes, and a central library.

History 
In 1977, the university was founded under the name of University of Batna. In the 1980s, it was named after Pr. Abrouk Madani, a former lecturer and researcher who acted as the first Rector. In the 1990s the university structures expanded through the opening of new Faculties and Institutes, which encouraged the rectorate's administration to suggest the name of the Algerian national Hero Mostefa Ben Boulaïd. Also called the father of the Algerian revolution whose centenary celebration was held in the city of Batna on 4 February 2017 in recognition of his great efforts and leadership as the first commander of zone 1 in the Aurès during the Algerian liberation war against the French in the mid 1950s. As of July 2015, the structure was comprising nine faculties, five institutes and a central library. Due to the continuously increasing demand of the baccalaureate holders in Algeria, the Ministry of Higher Education and Scientific Research, with the recommendation of the prime Minister Abdelmalek Sellal, adopted a new decentralization strategy as part of the new LMD (Licence Master Doctorate) orientations for a better and efficient higher educational management. This was a major reconstruction that split the university into 02 distinct Universities, namely: University of Batna 1 and University of Batna 2. Now University of Batna 2 Mostefa Ben Boulaïd is widely known as a science/technology oriented, although it comprises a faculty of medicine including a department of medicine and pharmacy  and faculty of Letters and Foreign Languages where English and French departments offer a wide range of courses including the fields of linguistics, didactics, culture and civilization.

Campus 
UB2 has five campuses: A main campus located in Fesdis (151 hectares), and four in the centre of city of Batna (19 hectares).

Fesdis Main Campus 

 The total surface of Fesdis Main Campus stretches across 151 hectares, of which 65 hectares are built and intended to academic purposes.

Conference Center 

 Also known as "Ex Mouhafada", the building is in the heart of Batna city with its (3000) sq/m, and considered as the roundabout of most events at University of Batna 2. The campus spans approximately (100) metres of the City Hall (Daira of Batna) at Route de Biskra, 05000 Batna;

Central Campus 

 "Abrouk Madani Center" (A.M.C) is campus that is dedicated to students and teachers of technology. The surface of C.A.M. is around (8000) sq/m. This structure is situated in 1, Rue Chahid Boukhlouf Med El Hadi, 05000 Batna.

Medical Campus 

 Centre Hospitalier Universitaire de Batna also known as CHU Benflis Al-Tohamy University Hospital is one of the largest campuses in Algeria with its 5000 square meters. It has a capacity of 540 rooms and nine medical services, six surgery services and a main emergency pavilion. Med students learn the following disciplines: Internal Medicine, Pediatry, Cardiology, Nephrology, Neuro-endocrinology, Burnings, Hematology, General Surgery, Maxillo-facial, Pediatric Surgery, Urology, Orthopedics, Neurosurgery, Ophthalmology, Legal Medicine, Work Medicine, Neurosurgery, Dermatology, Neurology, Physiology, Rheumatology, Gastroenterology, Epidemiology, Dental surgery.

Pharmacy Campus 
 Located in 742 Lgts district totaling a  surface

Architecture 
 Fesdis Main Campus architecture of UB2 has been inspired by the Chicago School. The buildings were designed with a cubic architectural style based on steel-frame construction and solid glasses, which gave the university a futuristic view. The conceptions, designs and constructions were realized by:
 BET Houcine Abdelaziz
 BETAC
 BE/TBatna
 BET/SEETA
 BET Hidjazi Cherif
 BET Hafiane
 The Conference Center was built in the 1970s and was the property of the National Liberation Party (FLN) until the 1990s. Constructed by Algerian entrepreneurs during the era of Socialism, the structure comprises a two-floor building and an fully equipped Auditorium.
 The Central Campus is an old construction that was built by the French in the 18th century. Characterized by French Colonial Style, the Central Campus was initially built as Hospital that served military French troops in the Aures.
 Both Medical and Pharmacy campuses were built in the 1980s and restored in the 2000s to expand the capacity of the structure for Med and Pharm students due to the growing population in Algeria.

Housing 
UB2 offers free-of-charge accommodation for more than 3000 students with seven buildings in the Fesdis Main Campus spread over 20 hectares with a capacity of 2000+1000 beds.

Food Services 
UB2 has three restaurants and three cafeterias divided as follows: two restaurants plus cafeteria in Fesdis Main Campus, and a restaurant-cafeteria in Central Campus. UB2 offers day service only with more than 6,000 meals served every day.

Transportation 
This service at UB2 is run by (French: "Office National des Œuvres Universitaires") (ONOU). It is mainly offering free-of-charge transportation to all students through buses with an overall fleet of 140 owned by private companies. Seventy buses serve the Fesdis Main Campus Line and seventy for the rest of campuses.

Athletics 
Fesdis Main Campus has a stadium and a semi-Olympic indoor swimming pool, plus five outdoor sport facilities, and finally an indoor fitness room. The UB2 is currently constructing another space dedicated for athletics, and two outdoor mid-size courtyards for soccer. All these structures are managed by the Physical and Sport Education Institute. Many sport disciplines are offered, such as football, basketball, volleyball, handball, athletics, and swimming.

Organization and administration 
The University of Batna two has a front office (French: Rectorat), Cabinet, Management Office (French: Secétariat Général SG), four vice-rectorates, five faculties, three institutes, and a central library.

Vice Rectorate 
 Public & External Affairs
 Graduate Studies & Students' Affairs
 Postgraduate Studies
 Development & Planning

Faculties and institutes 
 Faculty of Medecine
 Faculty of Technology; 
 Faculty of Maths & Computing
 Faculty of Life & Natural Science
 Faculty of Letters & Foreign Languages
 Institute of Physical & Sport Education
 Institute of Health & Safety
 Institute of Earth & Universe Science

University staff 
UB2 staff is (1,833) divided in (1,220) teachers and 613 employees.

Graduate and postgraduate programs 
University Batna 2 has a worldwide recognized educational system, which is part of the LMD reform that was initiated in Europe by the Bologna Process offering Bachelor's, Master's and Doctorate degrees.

Graduate program 
Academic and Professional Master's in Technology, namely Engineering, Electrical Engineering, Mechanical Engineering, and Civil Engineering. Professional training is also part of this program. Enrolled students: 27,700 preparing bachelor's and master's degrees.

Postgraduate program 
Academic Doctorate ES Science and PhD (Doctorate "D"). 1,971 students conduct their research dispatched as follows: 1,183 Doctorate ES Science, PhD 350, and 422 preparing Magister.

Post-Doctoral Studies 
16 Postdoc students undertaking "NEP" National Exceptional Program (French: PNE Programme National Exceptionnel)

Sabbatical/Academic year 
15 scholars for 2015–2016.

International cooperation and conventions 
 Erasmus+
 Miscellaneous Exchanges and Conventions

The UB2 Open University 
Online courses via UB2 TV and Radio and E-Learning Platform (Moodle).

Intensive Language Teaching Center 
(French: Centre d'Enseignement Intensif des Langues')

The Intensive Language Teaching Center is one of the most important structures in UB2. (1385) students are enrolled through three levels following the Common European Framework of Reference for Languages. The center offers a wide range of intensive teaching covering the many languages with the following number of enrolled students:
 495 students learning American English
 390 students learning French
 190 students learning German
 40 students learning Chinese
 5 students learning Amazigh

Central library 

UB2 has a central library situated in Fesdis Main Campus, and 8 dedicated faculty and institute libraries.

Research laboratories 
There are 15 research laboratories in UB2.

Students' associations and activities 
UB2 comprises eight National Students' associations:
 Union Nationale des Etudiants Algériens
 Alliance pour le Renouveau
 Union Générale des Etudiants Algériens
 Solidarité Nationale des Etudiant
 Organisation Nationale du Salue Etudiant
 Ligue Nationale des Etudiants Algériens
 Union Générale des Etudiants Libres
 Organisation Nationale des Etudiants Algériens

Traditions, customs and religion 
The UB2 is located in the Capital of the Aures. Amazigh et Arabic cultures are the core of a homogeneous society that lives with the peaceful values of Islam.

Alumni 
Its mission is to make the University of UB2 more open on the world, as well as keeping the former students, employees in touch at the national and international level.

References

External links 
 UB2 Official Website
 Hadj Lakhdar University
 Ministry of Higher Education and Scientific Research in Algeria
 World University Ranking UniRank

University of Batna